Patrick Canton (31 January 1896 – 24 June 1978) was an Irish hurler who played for Cork Senior Championship club St Finbarr's. He also had a brief career at senior level with the Cork county team, during which he lined out at midfield.

Honours
St Finbarr's
Cork Senior Hurling Championship (3): 1919, 1922, 1923

References

1896 births
1978 deaths
St Finbarr's hurlers
Cork inter-county hurlers
People from Youghal